Renée Govaert (born 25 January 1962) is a Belgian rower. She competed in the women's double sculls event at the 1992 Summer Olympics.

References

External links
 

1962 births
Living people
Belgian female rowers
Olympic rowers of Belgium
Rowers at the 1992 Summer Olympics
Place of birth missing (living people)